Li Gen, born August 15, 1988) is a Chinese professional basketball player who plays for the Beijing Royal Fighters in the Chinese Basketball Association.

Professional career
Li started his career with the Shanghai Sharks at the age of 20 during the 2008–09 CBA season. After two winters in Shanghai, he moved to the Qingdao Eagles for the next two years. He averaged 18 points per game to lead all domestic players in scoring during the 2011–12 CBA season, and was also the MVP of that campaign's CBA All-Star Game.

Li then spent the next three years of his career with the Beijing Ducks, helping the Capital Squad capture back-to-back league championships during the 2013–14 CBA season and 2014–15 CBA season. Unable to come to terms on a new contract with Beijing in the summer of 2015, he then signed with Xinjiang instead.

International career
On the international scene, Li represented China national basketball team at the 2015 FIBA Asia Championship in Changsha, China. He scored nine points in 13 minutes of action off the bench, as the PRC beat the Philippines 78-67 in the Championship Game, which was played on October 3.

References

External links
Asia-basket.com Profile
Real GM Profile
Li Gen China 2014-15 CBA | Full Highlight Video HD - Youtube.com video

1988 births
Living people
Basketball players at the 2016 Summer Olympics
Basketball players from Henan
Beijing Ducks players
Chinese men's basketball players
Olympic basketball players of China
People from Jiaozuo
Power forwards (basketball)
Qingdao Eagles players
Shanghai Sharks players
Small forwards
Xinjiang Flying Tigers players
Ningbo University alumni